The 2017–18 Northern Arizona Lumberjacks men's basketball team represented Northern Arizona University during the 2017–18 NCAA Division I men's basketball season. The Lumberjacks were led by sixth-year head coach Jack Murphy and played their home games at the Walkup Skydome in Flagstaff, Arizona as members of the Big Sky Conference. They finished the season 5–27, 2–16 in Big Sky play to finish in last place. They lost in the first round of the Big Sky tournament to Northern Colorado.

Previous season
The Lumberjacks finished the 2016–17 season 9–23, 6–12 in Big Sky play to finish in 10th place. Due to Northern Colorado's self-imposed postseason ban, the Lumberjacks were the No. 9 seed in the Big Sky tournament where the lost in the first round to Portland State.

Offseason

Departures

Incoming transfers

2017 incoming recruits

Roster

Schedule and results

|-
!colspan=9 style=| Non-conference regular season

|-
!colspan=9 style=| Big Sky regular season

|-
!colspan=9 style=| Big Sky tournament

References

Northern Arizona Lumberjacks men's basketball seasons
Northern Arizona
Northern Arizona Lumberjacks men's basketball
Northern Arizona Lumberjacks men's basketball